Per Jorsett (11 May 1920 – 30 January 2019) was a Norwegian freelance sports reporter, sport historian and sports shooter. He reported for Sportsmanden from 1945 to 1961, and for the newspapers Dagbladet and Nationen. He had commissions for the Norwegian Broadcasting Corporation from 1947 to 1991, often along with fellow reporter Knut Bjørnsen. Among his books are Norges skytterkonger, Hvem er hvem i norsk idrett and books on the Olympic Games.

Personal life
In 1943 Jorsett married Gerd Ingebjør Breen (1922–2009). He died in Oslo in 2019, aged 98.

Selected works

 (jointly with Aage Møst )
 (jointly with Knut Bjørnsen)

 (jointly with Egil Olsen, Otto Ulseth and Arne Scheie)
 (jointly with Arne Scheie)

References

1920 births
2019 deaths
Writers from Oslo
Norwegian journalists
Norwegian television journalists
NRK people
Norwegian sports journalists
Norwegian male sport shooters
Articles containing video clips
20th-century Norwegian people